Anirban Lahiri (born 29 June 1987) is an Indian professional golfer. He has played on the Asian Tour, European Tour, PGA Tour and LIV Golf.

Lahiri is recipient of the 2014 Arjuna Award. He is also recipient of "Sera Bangali" award (in 2015), given by the Anandabazar Patrika.

Early life
Lahiri hails from a Bengali family. He learned to play golf at the age of eight from his father, Dr. Tushar Lahiri, who was a physician with the armed forces and a recreational golfer.

Professional career
Lahiri joined the Asian Tour in 2008. He picked up his first victory in 2011 at the Panasonic Open and his second victory in 2012 at the SAIL-SBI Open. His best finish on the Order of Merit came in 2014 with his maiden overseas win on the Asian Tour - CIMB Niaga Indonesian Masters which he later followed up with another one at the Venetian Macau Open. He finished 3rd on the Order of Merit in 2013.

Lahiri broke into the top 100 in the Official World Golf Ranking for the first time in March 2014 following a consistent season which included two victories on the Asian Tour.

Lahiri has also had a lot of success on the Professional Golf Tour of India, where he has won eleven events and the Order of Merit in 2009.

The big break came for him when qualified for his maiden major tournament – the 2012 Open Championship at the Royal Lytham & St Annes Golf Club in Lancashire. He made it a most memorable outing, first by making the cut (68-72) and then with a hole-in-one at the par-3 9th hole in the third round en route to a T31 finish.

In February 2015, Lahiri claimed his first official win on the European Tour at the Maybank Malaysian Open, with a one stroke victory over Bernd Wiesberger. He shot a 10-under-par round of 62 during the third round to position himself going into the final day and came from four shots behind to prevail by one shot. Later the same month, Lahiri won his second event on the European Tour in his home country of India, at the Hero Indian Open. He came from seven strokes behind in the final round to force a playoff with Shiv Chawrasia, which he won with a birdie on the first extra hole. The two wins shot Lahiri into the top 50 of the Official World Golf Ranking qualifying him for the 2015 Masters Tournament. He was labelled as a "rookie to watch" and the "new face of Indian golf." He is the third Indian national to play in the Masters, after Jeev Milkha Singh and Arjun Atwal. He made the cut at his first appearance and ended the tournament with scores of 71-75-74-72 on his four rounds, leaving him tied for 49th with Jason Dufner.

In August 2015 at the PGA Championship which took place at Whistling Straits, Lahiri posted rounds of 70-67-70-68 for a score of −13. Despite a bogey at the 72nd hole, Lahiri finished in a tie for fifth place in the tournament and set a new record for the highest finish by an Indian professional golfer in a major. The top five finish on Sunday capped a memorable week in Wisconsin for Lahiri, whose performance catapulted him to 38th in the world golf ranking. He also won the PGA of America's pre-tournament long-drive contest on the Tuesday, hitting a 327-yard drive that won him a traditional gold money clip and a $25,000 charitable donation in his name. His performance set multiple records for an Indian golfer; he became the first Indian to shoot sub-par scores in all four rounds in a major, his total of 13-under was the best relative to par by an Indian at any major and his five-under 67 in the second round was also the best round by an Indian at any major.

Lahiri was named to the 2015 Presidents Cup squad, the first player from India to earn the honor. Lahiri attempted to qualify for the PGA Tour through the 2015 Web.com Tour Finals after earning enough non-member points to qualify. He was the highest-ranked player in the Finals, 40th at the start of the four-event tournament. Lahiri only played in the first two events, but earned enough for a PGA Tour card. He notched his first top-10 of the 2016 PGA Tour season with a T-6 finish at the Dean & DeLuca Invitational.

Lahiri also qualified for the 2016 Summer Olympics, earning a spot in the field of 60 players to compete at the Olympic Golf Course in Rio de Janeiro. He also led for the first time after 54 holes in a PGA Tour event during the CIMB Classic in 2017, finishing T-3. He would go on to achieve his best PGA Tour finish of T-2 at the 2017 Memorial Tournament. Lahiri was once again named in the 2017 Presidents Cup team. Lahiri finished the 2017 PGA Tour season finishing a career high 51st in the FedEx Cup standings. In the 2018 PGA Tour season, Lahiri shot his lowest round on the PGA Tour, a 61 at A Military Tribute at The Greenbrier. His best finish was a T-5 at the CJ Cup in the 2018 PGA Tour season. Anirban struggled in the 2019 season and ended up losing his PGA Tour card by finishing outside the top 125 of the FedEx Cup. He gained his PGA Tour card back for the 2020 season through the Korn Ferry Tour Finals by finishing 10th in the overall standing. Lahiri struggled on the 2020 PGA Tour and finished 219th in the FedEx Cup standings, playing less than 15 events in large part due to being unable travel back to the United States and being stuck in India due to the country lockdown as a result of the pandemic. Lahiri managed to hold on to his PGA Tour card due to circumstances related to the pandemic which resulted in postponement and cancellation of events, players who were on the PGA Tour for the 2020 season maintained guaranteed status for the 2021 season. He finished 118th in the FedEx Cup for the 2021 season retaining his card for the 2022 PGA Tour season with a highest finish of T3 at the Barbasol Championship.

In March 2022, Lahiri finished second at The Players Championship by one stroke to Cameron Smith. The Players is held at TPC Sawgrass in Ponte Vedra Beach, Florida. It has one of the strongest field of the year and has the richest purse of any tournament. By finishing second, Lahiri won $2,180,000, this is more than he ever won in a full PGA Tour season prior to this tournament.

LIV Golf

In August 2022, it was announced that Lahiri had joined LIV Golf.  At his first LIV Golf tournament, Lahiri finished in a three-way tie for first place at the LIV Golf Invitational Boston with Dustin Johnson and Joaquín Niemann. Lahiri lost the playoff to Johnson to finish second, earning $1,812,500 in the process.

Personal life
Lahiri is a resident of Palm Beach Gardens, Florida. He is of Bengali descent and speaks Bengali and Punjabi in addition to English. In May 2014, he married his long-time partner, Ipsa Jamwal. His personal interests include listening to music and computer gaming.

Professional wins (18)

European Tour wins (2)

1Co-sanctioned by the Asian Tour

European Tour playoff record (1–0)

Asian Tour wins (7)

1Co-sanctioned by the Professional Golf Tour of India
2Co-sanctioned by the European Tour

Asian Tour playoff record (4–1)

Professional Golf Tour of India wins (14)

1Co-sanctioned by the Asian Tour

Playoff record
LIV Golf Invitational Series playoff record (0–1)

Results in major championships
Results not in chronological order in 2020.

CUT = missed the half-way cut
"T" indicates a tie for a place
NT = No tournament due to COVID-19 pandemic

Summary

Most consecutive cuts made – 3 (2015 Open – 2016 Masters)
Longest streak of top 10s – 1

Results in The Players Championship

CUT = missed the halfway cut
"T" indicates a tie for a place
C = Canceled after the first round due to the COVID-19 pandemic

Results in World Golf Championships
Results not in chronological order before 2015.

"T" = Tied

Team appearances
Amateur
Asian Junior Golf Team Championship: 2005 (Team Gold Medal)
World Junior Golf Team Championship: 2005
Eisenhower Trophy: 2006
Doha Asian Games: 2006
Nomura Cup: 2007

Professional
World Cup (representing India): 2013, 2018
EurAsia Cup (representing Asia): 2014, 2016, 2018
Presidents Cup (representing the International team): 2015, 2017

See also
2014 European Tour Qualifying School graduates
2015 Web.com Tour Finals graduates
2019 Korn Ferry Tour Finals graduates
List of golfers with most Asian Tour wins

References

External links

Profile on the Professional Golf Tour of India's official site

Indian male golfers
Asian Tour golfers
European Tour golfers
PGA Tour golfers
LIV Golf players
Olympic golfers of India
Golfers at the 2016 Summer Olympics
Golfers at the 2020 Summer Olympics
Asian Games medalists in golf
Asian Games silver medalists for India
Golfers at the 2006 Asian Games
Medalists at the 2006 Asian Games
Korn Ferry Tour graduates
Golfers from Maharashtra
Golfers from Florida
Recipients of the Arjuna Award
Sportspeople from Bangalore
1987 births
Living people